Andy Ward (born 8 September 1970 in Whangarei, New Zealand) is an Irish rugby union player, currently playing at Ballynahinch RFC. He has played for Ireland with 28 caps, and for Ulster. At Ulster he won the Heineken Cup in 1999 when they defeated Colomiers 21–6 at Lansdowne Road in Dublin. In 2011, he became the strength and conditioning coach of the Antrim Gaelic Football team 

He currently runs a fitness studio in Dunadry, County Antrim, Northern Ireland.

References

Links
 Belfast Harlequins
 Ballynahinch RFC

Irish rugby union coaches
Irish rugby union players
Ireland international rugby union players
Ballynahinch RFC players
Ulster Rugby players
Belfast Harlequins rugby union players
Irish people of New Zealand descent
Rugby union players from Whangārei
Living people
1970 births